Jack N' Jill (pronounced as Jack and Jill)  is a 2022 Indian Malayalam-language science fiction comedy film directed by Santosh Sivan. It stars Manju Warrier, Kalidas Jayaram, Soubin Shahir,  Shaylee Krishen and Esther Anil in the lead role. The film marks cinematographer, Santosh Sivan's directorial comeback in Malayalam cinema after nearly 7 years. The film is released in theatres on 20 May 2022. The film is partially reshot in Tamil under title Centimeter with Yogi Babu replacing Soubin Shahir was also released on same day. The film was a box-office disaster.

Plot 
Kesh is a young scientist who returned from abroad to his grandfather's ancestral home in Kerala after winning an award in AI Robotics. He, along with his colleague, a miniature robot named Kuttaps, and childhood friends, plans to complete his deceased father's dream project named 'Jack N' Jill' which would boost the human brain to its maximum level. They search for a test object who is suffering from some a brain-related disease like dementia/amnesia and eventually abduct an elderly person. However, phase 1 of the project fails due to a mistake made by Kesh's friend. Afterwards, they find Parvathy, another potential test subject, as she is mentally unstable due to post traumatic amnesia. Kesh makes her their next test subject. They successfully complete Phase 1 and 2 of the project. After Phase 2, Parvathy regains her memories (but she pretends to be abnormal) and develops some combat skills. The antagonists of the story are Stephen Tharakan and his son, who want to establish a chemical factory, even though it would be detrimental to the environment. Stephen and his henchmen slaughter the entire family of Parvathy when her family tries to protect Aarthy, the daughter of Stephen Tharakan's deceased partner. Parvathy is injured badly during the incident and loses all her memories. Whether she avenge the death of her loved one forms the remainder of the story.

Cast

Soundtrack
The songs are composed by Jakes Bejoy, Gopi Sundar and Ram Surendar.
"Kim Kim" - Manju Warrier
"Angane" - Sithara
"Jack And Jill" - Jithin Raj
"Enganokke Enganokke" - Ram Surendar, Sree Nanda
"Annatha Pokki" - Kavya Ajit, Ram Surendar

Release

Theatrical
The film was released theatrically on 20 May 2022.

Home Media
The digital rights of the film is acquired by Amazon Prime Video and started streaming on 17 June 2022.

Reception
The film received highly negative reviews and was widely criticized on the story, screenplay, performance and direction.

References

External links
 

Indian thriller films
Films directed by Santosh Sivan